One Wintry Night: A David Phelps Christmas is a Christmas album from Christian singer David Phelps. It was released on September 25, 2007 by Word Records.

Track listing

All songs written by David Phelps, except where noted.
 "O Come, O Come, Emmanuel" (Prelude) (Public Domain) - 2:02
 "The Singer (Let There Be Light)" - 3:48
 "Hallelujah!" - 3:04
 "Blue Christmas" (Billy Hayes, Jay W. Johnson) - 3:34
 "Lully, Lullay (With What Child Is This?)" (Interlude) (Public Domain) - 2:44
 "Away in a Manger (with Sleep, Little Baby)" (William J. Kirkpatrick, Phelps) - 4:56
 "One Wintry Night" - 4:41
 "If Everyone Believed" - 3:14
 "If Christmas Never Came" - 4:36
 "Silent Night" (Interlude) (Franz Xaver Gruber, Moore) - 2:40
 "O Holy Night" (Adolphe Adam, John Sullivan Dwight) - 5:13
 "Hark the Herald!" - 4:06
 "One King" - 4:38
 "Santa Claus Is Coming to Town" (Interlude) (John Frederick Coots, Haven Gillespie) - 2:25
 "Santa Claus Tonight" - 2:56

Personnel 
 David Phelps – vocals 
 Jeff Roach – keyboards, string arrangements 
 Gary Burnette – acoustic guitars, electric guitars 
 Scott Denté – acoustic guitars, electric guitars 
 Mark Hill – bass guitar
 Ken Lewis – drums, percussion 
 Jack Daniels – harmonica
 Mike Haynes – trumpet, flugelhorn
 Chris Carmichael – strings
 Love Sponge String Quartet:
 John Catchings – cello
 Monisa Angel – viola
 David Angell – violin
 David Davidson – violin
 Monroe Jones – string arrangements 
 Steve Lamb – music copyist 
 Sonya Isaacs – vocals

Production 
 Monroe Jones – producer, engineer 
 Jim Dineen – engineer 
 Fred Paragano – engineer, mixing 
 Tom Laune – mixing 
 Travis Palmer – additional engineer, assistant engineer, mix assistant 
 Andrew Mendelson – mastering at Georgetown Masters (Nashville, Tennessee)
 Natthaphol Abhigantaphand – mastering assistant 
 Brent Kaye – mastering assistant 
 Conor Farley – A&R 
 Jamie Kiner – production coordinator 
 Katherine Petillo – art direction 
 Ray Roper – design 
 David Kaufman – wardrobe

Reception

Chart performance

The album peaked at #23 on Billboard's Christian Albums and #7 on Holiday Albums.

Awards

The album received a nomination at the 39th GMA Dove Awards for Christmas Album of the Year.

References

External links
One Wintry Night on Amazon.com
One Wintry Night on CD Universe

2007 Christmas albums
Christmas albums by American artists
David Phelps albums
Gospel Christmas albums